Gymnopus biformis is a North American species of agaric fungus in the family Omphalotaceae. The species was originally described by Charles Horton Peck in 1903 as Marasmius biformis. The specific epithet biformis refers to the two distinct cap shapes, which Peck noted could be either campanulate (bell-shaped) or flattened. Roy Halling transferred the fungus to Gymnopus  in 1997.

See also
List of Gymnopus species

References

External links

Fungi described in 1903
Fungi of North America
Marasmiaceae